Boyarsky  (masculine) or Boyarskaya (feminine) is a Russian surname, derived from "boyar" (nobleman). It may refer to:

 Aleksandr Boyarsky (born 1956), a Russian producer, scriptwriter, and voice artist. He is the founder and CEO of the Melnitsa Animation Studio.
 Iosif Boyarsky (1917-2008), a Russian animator and film director
 Jerry Boyarsky, a former American football player
 Elizaveta Boyarskaya (born 1985), a Russian actress, daughter of Mikhail Boyarsky
 Leonard Boyarsky, an American computer game designer and visual artist
 Maurizio Boyarsky (1923–1998), pseudonym of American mathematician Bernard Dwork
 Mikhail Boyarsky (born 1949), a Russian actor and singer
 Natalia Boyarskaya (born 1983), a Russian professional racing cyclist
 Natalya Boyarskaya (born 1946), a Russian violinist and music teacher
 Sergey Boyarsky (born 1980), a Russian politician, son of Mikhail Boyarsky
 Vladimir Boyarsky, a Russian general

See also 
 Boyarskaya Duma

Russian-language surnames